The Times and Olympia Buildings are a pair of historic buildings in central New Bedford, Massachusetts.  The Times Building, also known as the Slocum or Evans Building, stands at 908–912 Purchase Street, and was built in 1897 to a design by Nat. C. Smith.  Originally a furniture store, it was home to the New Bedford Times until the 1950s.  The Olympia Building stands next door; it was designed by Mowll & Rand of Boston and built in 1921.  It is a four-story brick building, with shops on the ground floor and offices above.

The buildings were listed on the National Register of Historic Places in 1983.

See also
Union Baptist Church (New Bedford, Massachusetts), also designed by Smith and NRHP-listed

See also
National Register of Historic Places listings in New Bedford, Massachusetts

References

Newspaper headquarters in the United States
Newspaper buildings
Office buildings on the National Register of Historic Places in Massachusetts
Buildings and structures in New Bedford, Massachusetts
National Register of Historic Places in New Bedford, Massachusetts
Historic district contributing properties in Massachusetts